Hojjatabad-e Sofla may refer to:
 Hojjatabad-e Sofla, Kermanshah
 Hojjatabad-e Sofla, Yazd